American Factory is a 2019 documentary film  produced by Steven Bognar, who also co-directed the film with Julia Reichert. The film is about a Chinese company repurposing a former car-manufacturing plant in the American city of Moraine, Ohio. It was the first picture produced by Higher Ground Productions, a production company established by Barack and Michelle Obama.

Accolades

Notes

References

External links 
 

American Factory